In mathematics, an integrating factor is a function that is chosen to facilitate the solving of a given equation involving differentials. It is commonly used to solve ordinary differential equations, but is also used within multivariable calculus when multiplying through by an integrating factor allows an inexact differential to be made into an exact differential (which can then be integrated to give a scalar field). This is especially useful in thermodynamics where temperature becomes the integrating factor that makes entropy an exact differential.

Use 
An integrating factor is any expression that a differential equation is multiplied by to facilitate integration. For example, the nonlinear second order equation

 

admits  as an integrating factor:

 

To integrate, note that both sides of the equation may be expressed as derivatives by going backwards with the chain rule:

 

Therefore,

 

where  is a constant.

This form may be more useful, depending on application. Performing a separation of variables will give

 

This is an implicit solution which involves a nonelementary integral. This same method is used to solve the period of a simple pendulum.

Solving first order linear ordinary differential equations 
Integrating factors are useful for solving ordinary differential equations that can be expressed in the form

The basic idea is to find some function, say , called the "integrating factor", which we can multiply through our differential equation in order to bring the left-hand side under a common derivative.

Note that it is not necessary to include the arbitrary constant in the integral, or absolute values in case the integral of  involves a logarithm. Firstly, we only need one integrating factor to solve the equation, not all possible ones; secondly, such constants and absolute values will cancel out even if included. For absolute values, this can be seen by writing , where  refers to the sign function, which will be constant on an interval if  is continuous. As  is undefined when , and a logarithm in the antiderivative only appears when the original function involved a logarithm or a reciprocal (neither of which are defined for 0), such an interval will be the interval of validity of our solution.

To derive this, let  be the integrating factor of a first order linear differential equation such that multiplication by  transforms a partial derivative into a total derivative, then:

Going from step 2 to step 3 requires that , which is a separable differential equation, whose solution yields  in terms of :

To verify, multiplying by  gives

By applying the product rule in reverse, we see that the left-hand side can be expressed as a single derivative in 

We use this fact to simplify our expression to

Integrating both sides with respect to 

where  is a constant.

Moving the exponential to the right-hand side, the general solution to Ordinary Differential Equation is:

In the case of a homogeneous differential equation,  and the general solution to Ordinary Differential Equation is:

.

for example, consider the differential equation

We can see that in this case 

Multiplying both sides by  we obtain

The above equation can be rewritten as

By integrating both sides with respect to x we obtain

or

The same result may be achieved using the following approach

Reversing the quotient rule gives

or

or

where  is a constant.

Solving second order linear ordinary differential equations 

The method of integrating factors for first order equations can be naturally extended to second order equations as well. The main goal in solving first order equations was to find an integrating factor  such that multiplying  by it would yield , after which subsequent integration and division by  would yield . For second order linear differential equations, if we want  to work as an integrating factor, then

This implies that a second order equation must be exactly in the form  for the integrating factor to be usable.

Example 1 
For example, the differential equation

can be solved exactly with integrating factors. The appropriate can be deduced by examining the  term. In this case, so . After examining the  term, we see that we do in fact have , so we will multiply all terms by the integrating factor . This gives us

which can be rearranged to give

Integrating twice yields

Dividing by the integrating factor gives:

Example 2

A slightly less obvious application of second order integrating factors involves the following differential equation:

At first glance, this is clearly not in the form needed for second order integrating factors. However,

and from the Pythagorean identity relating cotangent and cosecant,

Multiplying each term by  gives

which rearranged is

Integrating twice gives

Finally, dividing by the integrating factor gives

Solving nth order linear differential equations 
Integrating factors can be extended to any order, though the form of the equation needed to apply them gets more and more specific as order increases, making them less useful for orders 3 and above. The general idea is to differentiate the function   times for an th order differential equation and combine like terms. This will yield an equation in the form 

If an th order equation matches the form  that is gotten after differentiating  times, one can multiply all terms by the integrating factor and integrate   times, dividing by the integrating factor on both sides to achieve the final result.

Example 
A third order usage of integrating factors gives

thus requiring our equation to be in the form

For example in the differential equation 

Rearranging gives 

Integrating thrice and dividing by the integrating factor yields

See also
 Variation of parameters
 Differential equations
 Product rule
 Quotient rule
 Exact differential
 Matrix exponential

References
 .

Ordinary differential equations

de:Exakte Differentialgleichung